DeWitt is an unincorporated community located in Mitchell County, Georgia, United States.

History
A post office called Dewitt was established in 1887, and remained in operation until 1926. The community was named after Dewitt C. Bacon, a first settler.

References

Unincorporated communities in Mitchell County, Georgia
Unincorporated communities in Georgia (U.S. state)